This is a list of statistics and records related to Clube de Regatas do Flamengo. Flamengo is a Brazilian professional association football club based in Rio de Janeiro, RJ, that currently plays in the Campeonato Brasileiro Série A.

Football honours

International
Intercontinental Cup: 1
1981

Continental
Copa Libertadores: 3
1981, 2019, 2022

Copa Mercosul: 1 (record) 
1999

Copa de Oro: 1 (record)
1996

Recopa Sudamericana: 1
2020

National

League
Campeonato Brasileiro Série A: 7 
1980, 1982, 1983, 1992, 2009, 2019, 2020

Copa União: 1 (record) 
1987

Cups
Supercopa do Brasil: 2 (record) 
2020, 2021

Copa do Brasil: 4
1990, 2006, 2013, 2022

Copa dos Campeões: 1 (record) 
2001

Regional
Torneio Rio-São Paulo: 1 
1961

Local
Campeonato Carioca: 37 (record)
1914, 1915, 1920, 1921, 1925, 1927, 1939, 1942, 1943, 1944, 1953, 1954, 1955, 1963, 1965, 1972, 1974, 1978, 1979 (C), 1979 (S), 1981, 1986, 1991, 1996, 1999, 2000, 2001, 2004, 2007, 2008, 2009, 2011, 2014, 2017, 2019, 2020, 2021

Friendly
Marlboro Cup : 1
1990

Women's

National
Campeonato Brasileiro de Futebol Feminino: 1 
2016

Local
Campeonato Carioca de Futebol Feminino: 6
2015, 2016 , 2017 , 2018 , 2019 , 2021

Players records

Appearances
 Youngest player: Lorran –  (against Audax Rio, Campeonato Carioca, 12 January 2023)
 Youngest first-team player: Lorran –  (against Bangu, Campeonato Carioca, 24 January 2023)

All-time records
All matches, including friendlies and non-official matches.
Players in bold currently still play for the club.
Players in italic currently still play professional football.

Foreign players all-time records
All matches, including friendlies and non-official matches.
Players in bold currently still play for the club.
Players in italic currently still play professional football.

1 Includes only official matches.

Brazilian League appearance records
Includes only matches for the Brazilian National League, created only in 1971.
Players in bold currently still play for the club.
Players in italic currently still play professional football.

Foreign players Brazilian League appearance records
Includes only matches for the Brazilian National League, created only in 1971.
Players in bold currently still play for the club.
Players in italic currently still play professional football.

*Dual or multiple citizenship.

Goalscorers
 Youngest goalscorer: Lorran –  (against Bangu, Campeonato Carioca, 24 January 2023)
 Most goals in a season in all competitions:a 43 – Gabriel Barbosa, 2019
 Most League goals: 135 – Zico
 Most League goals in a season: 25 – Gabriel Barbosa, 2019
 Most League goals in a 38-game season: 25 – Gabriel Barbosa, 2019
 Most goals scored in a match:a 4 – Pedro (4 goals) vs Deportes Tolima, Copa Libertadores, 6 July 2022
 Goals in consecutive League matches:a 7 consecutive matches – Gabriel Barbosa, 17 August 2019 to 25 September 2019
 Fastest goal:b 16 seconds – Lucas Paquetá vs Vitória, Série A, 14 April 2018
 Most hat-tricks:a 4 – Pedro

a Since 2019.
b Since 2018.

All-time goal records
All goals, including friendlies and non-official matches.
Players in bold currently still play for the club.
Players in italic currently still play professional football.

1 Includes only official matches.

Foreign players all-time goal records
All goals, including friendlies and non-official matches.
Players in bold currently still play for the club.
Players in italic currently still play professional football.

1 Includes only official matches.

Brazilian League records
Includes only matches and goals for the Brazilian National League, created only in 1971.
Players in bold currently still play for the club.
Players in italic currently still play professional football.

Foreign players Brazilian League goal records
Includes only goals for the Brazilian National League, created only in 1971.
Players in bold currently still play for the club.
Players in italic currently still play professional football.

*Dual or multiple citizenship.

Award winners

Club player of the Year

The following players have won the Flamengo Player of the Year award given by the club after public voting:
 Diego – 2016

South American Footballer of the Year

The following players have won the South American Footballer of the Year award while playing for Flamengo:
 Zico – 1977, 1981, 1982
 Gabriel Barbosa – 2019
 Pedro – 2022

Internationals

FIFA World Cup

The following players have won the FIFA World Cup while playing for Flamengo:
 Mário Zagallo – 1958
 Moacir – 1958
 Joel – 1958
 Dida – 1958
 Brito – 1970
 Gilmar Rinaldi – 1994
 Juninho Paulista – 2002

Copa América

The following players have won the Copa América while playing for Flamengo:
 Carregal – 1919
 Galo – 1919
 Píndaro – 1919
 Kuntz – 1922
 Junqueira – 1922
 Jair da Rosa Pinto – 1949
 Zizinho – 1949
 Zé Carlos – 1989
 Bebeto – 1989
 Romário – 1997
 Beto – 1999
 Zé Roberto – 1999
 Júlio César – 2004
 Felipe – 2004

Managerial records

 First full-time manager: Ramón Platero – Platero was manager of Flamengo for less than a year in 1921 with a total of eight matches.
 Longest-serving manager: Flávio Costa – 7 years (293 matches; 1938 to 1945).

Transfers records

Highest transfer fees paid

Players in bold currently still play for the club.
The list is ordered by the amount of R$ paid.

Highest transfer fees received
The list is ordered by the amount of R$ received.

Team records

National league records

Old league format (1971–2002)

Current national league format

1 Although finishing 11th place in 2013 with 49 points, Flamengo dropped to 16th place, with 45 points, due to the loss of 4 points caused by selecting a suspended player in Round 38.

All-time league record
Statistics correct as of match played on 12 November 2022.
 Teams with this background in the "Club" column are competing in the 2023 Campeonato Brasileiro Série A alongside Flamengo.
 Clubs with this background in the "Club" column are defunct.
P = matches played; W = matches won; D = matches drawn; L = matches lost; F = Goals scored; A = Goals conceded; Win% = percentage of total matches won

Copa do Brasil

All-time Copa do Brasil record
Statistics correct as of match played on 19 October 2022.
 Clubs with this background in the "Club" column are defunct.
P = matches played; W = matches won; D = matches drawn; L = matches lost; F = Goals scored; A = Goals conceded; Win% = percentage of total matches won

Supercopa do Brasil

FIFA tournaments

FIFA Club World Cup

Conmebol tournaments

Recopa Sudamericana

Copa Libertadores

Copa Sudamericana

Defunct tournaments

Supercopa Libertadores

Copa Mercosur

Copa de Oro

Intercontinental Cup

All-time international record
Statistics correct as of match played on 28 February 2023.

Average attendances
Current national league format

Footnotes

References

External links
Clube de Regatas do Flamengo official website 
Estrangeiros do Flamengo (Flapédia) 
Conmebol official website 

Statistics
Brazilian football club statistics